Michael Knapp (born January 30, 2000) is an American professional soccer player who plays as a midfielder for USL Championship club Rio Grande Valley FC.

Club career
Born in Bloomfield, New Jersey, Knapp played prep soccer at Bloomfield High School and began his career with the Cedar Stars Academy before joining the youth academy at the New York Red Bulls in 2017. On July 15, 2018, Knapp played in one match for the New York Red Bulls U-23 in the Premier Development League against the Ocean City Nor'easters, coming on as a late substitute during the 1–2 defeat.

In the fall of 2018, Knapp began attending Montclair State University and playing college soccer for the Montclair Red Hawks. He made his collegiate debut on August 31, 2018 against SUNY Oneonta. He ended his first season starting in all 17 matches for the Red Hawks and earning the New Jersey Athletic Conference Rookie of the Year award. 

During Knapp's sophomore season, he scored his first Red Hawks goal on August 31, 2019 against the St. Joseph's-Brooklyn Bears and scored a goal each in two conference matches against the William Paterson Pioneers and TCNJ Lions. He played in 18 matches that season, scoring the 3 goals, and earned the NJAC Midfielder of the Year award.

New York Red Bulls II
On November 13, 2020, Knapp signed with USL League Two club Morris Elite, however, on April 23, 2021, it was announced that Knapp had signed with USL Championship side New York Red Bulls II, the reserve side of the New York Red Bulls. He made his professional debut for the club on April 30 against Hartford Athletic, starting in a 2–3 defeat.

Austin FC
On January 11, 2022, Knapp was drafted by MLS side Austin FC.

Rio Grande Valley FC Toros
Knapp joined Rio Grande Valley FC of USL Championship on January 26, 2023.

Career statistics

Honours
Individual
2018 NJAC Rookie of the Year
2019 NJAC Midfielder of the Year

References

External links
 Profile at Montclair State University

2000 births
Living people
Sportspeople from Essex County, New Jersey
Association football midfielders
Bloomfield High School (New Jersey) alumni
People from Bloomfield, New Jersey
New York Red Bulls U-23 players
FC Motown players
Morris Elite SC players
New York Red Bulls II players
Rio Grande Valley FC Toros players
National Premier Soccer League players
USL League Two players
USL Championship players
Soccer players from New Jersey
American soccer players
Austin FC draft picks